The Cat Who Wished to Be a Man (1973) is a children's comic fantasy novel by Lloyd Alexander.

Plot
Lionel, a housecat given the power of speech by the magician Stephanus, begs his master to turn him into a man. After many objections concerning the depravity of humans, Stephanus relents, and the transformed Lionel begins his adventures to the town of Brightford. The mayor and his officers are plaguing Brightford with capricious rule and economic hardship. The mayor is especially covetous of the inn belonging to Gillian, with whom Lionel begins a rocky friendship. Lionel becomes entangled in the struggles of Brightford, and escalates the conflicts between the mayor and the people, while falling in love with Gillian as he becomes more and more human.

1973 American novels
1973 fantasy novels
1973 children's books
American children's novels
Children's fantasy novels
Novels about cats
Novels by Lloyd Alexander
E. P. Dutton books